This Christmas Time is the fourth studio album and first Christmas album by the American country music group Lonestar. Their first Christmas album, it was released in 2000 on BNA Records. Most of the tracks are renditions of traditional Christmas material, with three newly written tracks — the title track, "If Every Day Could Be Christmas", and "Reason for the Season".

Track listing

Personnel 
Lonestar
 Richie McDonald – lead vocals, keyboards, acoustic guitar
 Dean Sams – keyboards, acoustic piano, acoustic guitar, harmonica, backing vocals
 Michael Britt – acoustic guitar, electric guitars, backing vocals 
 Keech Rainwater – drums, percussion

Additional Musicians
 Tim Akers – keyboards, acoustic piano
 Matt Rollings – keyboards, acoustic piano
 Dann Huff – electric guitars
 Larry Beaird – acoustic guitar, steel guitar
 Biff Watson – acoustic guitar, bouzouki
 Bruce Bouton – steel guitar
 Paul Franklin – steel guitar
 Mike Brignardello – bass guitar
 Paul Leim – drums
 Eric Darken – percussion 
 Aubrey Haynie – fiddle
 Jonathan Yudkin – cello, fiddle, mandolin
 Kirk "Jelly Roll" Johnson – harmonica
 Robbie Cheuvront – backing vocals
 Glen M. Childress – backing vocals
 Lisa Cochran – backing vocals
 Vicki Hampton – backing vocals 
 Gene Miller – backing vocals
 Russell Terrell – backing vocals

Production
 Dann Huff – producer 
 Jeff Balding – recording, mixing 
 Eric Bickel – recording assistant, mix assistant 
 Jed Hackett – recording assistant, mix assistant  
 Mark Hagen – recording assistant, mix assistant, additional recording 
 Bart Pursley – additional recording 
 Shawn Simpson – digital editing 
 Doug Sax – mastering at The Mastering Lab (Hollywood, California)
 Robert Hadley – mastering assistant 
 Mike "Frog" Griffith – production coordinator 
 Norman Jean Roy – photography 
 Michelle Vanderpool – hair, make-up 
 Ann Waters – stylist

Charts

Weekly charts

Year-end charts

References

Albums produced by Dann Huff
BNA Records albums
Lonestar albums
2000 Christmas albums
Christmas albums by American artists
Country Christmas albums